Suzanne Prou (1920 Grimaud, Var - December 29–30, 1995) was a French novelist.
She won the 1973 Prix Renaudot, for The Bernardini Terrace.
She is buried in Montparnasse Cemetery.

Works
Les Patapharis (Ed. Calmann-Lévy) 1966
The Patapharis affair: a novel,  H. Regnery Co., 1970
Les Demoiselles sous les ébéniers (Ed. Calmann-Lévy) 1967
Mlle. Savelli?, Harper & Row, 1971
L'Été jaune (Ed. Calmann-Lévy) 1968
The yellow summer, Harper & Row, 1972
La Ville sur la mer (Ed. Calmann-Lévy) 1970
Méchamment les oiseaux (Ed. Calmann-Lévy) 1972 Prix Cazes
La Terrasse des Bernardini (Ed. Calmann-Lévy) 1973 Prix Renaudot
The Bernardinis' terrace, A. Ellis, 1975
La petite boutique (Ed. Mercure de France) 1973
The paperhanger , Harper & Row, 1974, 
Miroirs d'Edmée (Ed. Calmann-Lévy) 1976
La belle Edmée, Harper & Row, 1978, 
Le rapide Paris-Vintimille (Ed. Mercure de France) 1977
Les Femmes de la pluie (Ed. Calmann-Lévy) 1978
La dépêche (Ed. Balland, collection L'instant romanesque) 1978
Les dimanches (Ed. Calmann-Lévy) 1979
Le cygne de Fanny (Ed. Mercure de France) 1980
Le voyage aux Seychelles (Ed. Calmann-Lévy) 1981
Mauriac et la jeune fille (Ed. Ramsay) 1982
Le pré aux narcisses (Ed. Calmann-Lévy) 1983
Les amis de Monsieur Paul (Ed. Mercure de France) 1985
Le dit de Marguerite (Ed. Calmann-Lévy) 1986
La Petite Tonkinoise (récit) (Ed. Calmann-Lévy) 1986
Le Temps des innocents (Ed. Albin Michel) 1988
La notairesse (Ed. Albin Michel) 1989
La Demoiselle de grande vertu (nouvelles) (Ed. Albin Michel) 1990
Car déjà le jour baisse (Ed. Albin Michel) 1991
La maison des champs (Ed. Grasset) 1993
L'Album de famille (Ed. Grasset) 1995
Dernières feuilles (posthume) (Ed. Grasset) 1998

References

External links
Suzanne Prou ou le charme discret et pervers de la bourgeoisie
"Suzanne Prou au miroir", L'Express, 06/08/1998

People from Var (department)
1920 births
1995 deaths
Prix Renaudot winners
20th-century French novelists